Gadi may refer to:
 The Gaɗi language of Nigeria
 The Gaddi language of India